Formal trousers, also known as formal striped trousers or colloquially spongebag trousers, are grey striped or patterned formal trousers for day attire in traditional Western dress code, primarily associated with formal morning dress or secondly its semi-formal equivalent black lounge suit. Traditionally made from heavy wool ranging from worsted, melton to partial twill weave, the pattern is most often of a muted design in stripes of black, silver, white and charcoal grey in various combinations (not to be confused with pinstripe or chalkstripe, which are formed of single thin lines spaced equally apart). In addition, formal trousers may also come in check patterns, such as houndstooth check, or plaids, although these variants are widely considered as not the most formal.

Typically, formal trousers are intended to be worn with braces with a fishtail back covered by a waistcoat, and have pleats for correct ironing result and comfort. Likewise, for traditional reasons of formality, they do not have turn-ups, since these are considered less formal.

Name
The British synonym "cashmere striped trousers" refers to the actual name of the stripe pattern, and not to the fabric. Similarly, the slang term "spongebag trousers" or "spongebags" is due to the perceived similarity of the distinctive stripe pattern to traditional sponge-bags, a bag of toiletries (but does not apply to check patterns). In Germany, the synonym "Stresemann trousers" occurs, for the same reasons as the semi-formal stroller is called a "Stresemann".

History
Formal trousers were originally introduced in the first half of the 19th century as a complement to the then widely worn frock coat. As established formal day attire trousers, they were subsequently introduced to go with the morning dress, which in turn gradually replaced the frock coat as formal day attire standard by 20th century, along with its semi-formal equivalent black lounge suit.

Gallery

See also
 Trews

References

External links

Formal wear
Trousers and shorts
Semi-formal wear